Amado may refer to:

Places
 Amado, Arizona

Name
 Amado Crowley (1930–2010), occult teacher and self-proclaimed illegitimate son of Aleister Crowley
 Amado Carrillo Fuentes (1956-1997), Mexican drug kingpin and former leader of the Juárez Cartel
 Amado Boudou (born 1963), Argentine politician and businessman, vice-president since 2011

Surname
 Diogo Amado (born 1990), Portuguese football player
 Flávio Amado (born 1979), Angolan football player
 Jorge Amado (1912–2001), Brazilian writer
 Lauro Amadò (1912–1971), Swiss football player
 Luís Amado (born 1953), Portuguese politician
 Marijke Amado (born 1954), Dutch television presenter
 Miguel Amado (born 1984), Uruguayan football player

Architecture
 Amado (Architecture) (:ja:雨戸) - a kind of sliding  window shutter in Japan.

Portuguese masculine given names
Spanish masculine given names